Takashi Ogasawara (小笠原 孝, born November 29, 1976 in Funabashi, Chiba Prefecture) is a former Japanese professional baseball pitcher who played for the Chunichi Dragons in Japan's Nippon Professional Baseball. As of 2013 he has been employed as a member of the Dragons 2nd team pitching coaching team.

External links

NPB.com

1976 births
Living people
People from Funabashi
Meiji University alumni
Japanese baseball players
Nippon Professional Baseball pitchers
Chunichi Dragons players
Japanese baseball coaches
Nippon Professional Baseball coaches
Baseball people from Chiba Prefecture